The 2015 Tallinn Trophy was an international figure skating competition held in November 2015 at the Tondiraba Ice Hall in Tallinn, Estonia. Its senior-level event was part of the 2015–16 ISU Challenger Series. Medals were awarded in the disciplines of men's singles, ladies' singles, pair skating, and ice dancing.

Entries
The preliminary entries were published on 22 October 2015.

Results: Challenger Series

Medal summary

Men

Ladies

Pairs

Ice dancing

Results: Junior and advanced novice

Medal summary: Junior

Medal summary: Advanced novice

References

External links
 
 2015 Tallinn Trophy results
 2015 Tallinn Trophy at the International Skating Union

2015 CS
2015 in figure skating
2015 in Estonian sport
21st century in Tallinn
November 2015 sports events in Europe